The Jerusalem Kings were an amateur American football team based in Jerusalem and a member of the Israel Football League (IFL). The team played its home games at Kraft Family Stadium. A year after a rule was instituted limiting the number of foreigners on a roster, the team disbanded after the 2014–2015 season. Most players who wished to continue playing in the IFL joined the Judean Rebels.

History

2008 season 
The Jerusalem Kings began as the fifth franchise in the IFL and the second team based in Jerusalem (following the Jerusalem Lions). The Kings finished their inaugural season with a record of 1-7.

2009 season 
The Kings improved in their second year and finished the regular season with a record of 6-4 before taking third place in the IFL playoffs by beating the Judean Rebels.

2010–2011 season 
The Kings took a step back in their third year and finished the regular season with a record of 1-9.

2012–2013 season 
The Kings finished in a three-way tie for fourth place with a record of 5-5 along with the Judean Rebels and Haifa Underdogs. The Kings and Rebels made the playoffs due to point differential. The Kings beat the 8-2 Hatikva Hammers on a last second Hail Mary pass in the first round, then lost to the eventual champion Tel-Aviv Sabres in the semi-finals.

References

External links 
 http://www.jpost.com/Sports/Article.aspx?id=170630

American football teams in Israel
Sport in Jerusalem
American football teams established in 2008
American football teams disestablished in 2015
2008 establishments in Israel
2015 establishments in Israel